Sir Alan Colin Drake Yarrow,  FCSI (born 27 June 1951) was Lord Mayor of London 2014–15. He is an investment banker, who has served as Chairman of the Chartered Institute for Securities & Investment (CISI) since 2009.

Biography

Early life
Yarrow was born at Johor Bahru, Malaysia, and attended Harrow School before studying at Manchester Business School.

Finance career 
Yarrow worked as a financier in the City of London for 37 years with Dresdner Kleinwort until December 2009 and latterly as Chairman of its UK banking operations. He has also been Deputy Chairman of the Financial Services Authority practitioner panel, as well as serving on the Council of the British Bankers' Association and the Takeover Panel.

Civic service 
Yarrow was appointed a Justice of the Peace (JP) for the Courts of England and Wales in London in 2007. Yarrow has represented the Ward of Bridge and Bridge Without since becoming a City Alderman in 2007. He was admitted as a Liveryman of the Worshipful Company of Fishmongers in 2007. He has since become a member of the International Bankers', Glaziers' and Launderers' livery companies. He is an Honorary Liveryman of the Worshipful Company of Scientific Instrument Makers.

Sir Alan served as Sheriff of London for 2011–2012. On 28 October 2014, he was elected to succeed Dame Fiona Woolf as the 687th Lord Mayor of London, serving for 2014–15. His responsibilities for his annual term as Lord Mayor commenced on 9 November 2014, the day before the Lord Mayor's Show. Among numerous other duties, Yarrow has promoted the City of London and UK financial services worldwide in liaison with the Foreign and Commonwealth Office.

Personal life
Yarrow married Gillian (nee Clarke) in 1975. Lady Yarrow is a former teacher. The couple has two sons, Max and Guy. Lady Yarrow is Master of the Worshipful Company of Feltmakers.

Honours 
Yarrow was knighted in the 2016 New Year Honours for "services to international business, inclusion and the City of London".
  – Knight Bachelor (2015)
  – KJStJ (2014)
  – Placa (Officer), Order of the Aztec Eagle (2015)
 Honorary Fellowship of Chartered Institute for Securities & Investment (FCSI) (2010).
 Honorary Doctor of Science Degree from the City, University of London on 17 December 2014.

Arms

See also 
 City of London
 Corporation of London

References

External links 
 Mansion House website
 www.bbc.co.uk/iplayer Lord Mayor's Show 2014
 Debrett's People of Today profile
 Gresham College website
 St John International website
 www.cityam.com
 www.itv.com

1951 births
Living people
People from Johor
People educated at Harrow School
Alumni of the University of Manchester
Knights of Justice of the Order of St John
Councilmen and Aldermen of the City of London
English bankers
Knights Bachelor
21st-century lord mayors of London
21st-century British politicians
Businesspeople awarded knighthoods